North Union Local School District or North Union Local Schools is a school district headquartered in Richwood, Ohio. It operates North Union Elementary School, North Union Middle School, and North Union High School.

References

External links
 
School districts in Ohio
Education in Union County, Ohio